Per Pallesen (born 30 April 1942) is a Danish actor. He has appeared in more than 35 films since 1967.

Selected filmography
 Onkel Joakims hemmelighed (1967)
 Girls at Arms (1975)
 Girls at Sea (1977)

References

External links

1942 births
Living people
Danish male film actors
People from Vesthimmerland Municipality